Guns of the Black Witch is a 1961 adventure film directed by Domenico Paolella.

Cast 

 Don Megowan: Jean
 Silvana Pampanini: Delores 
 Emma Danieli: Elisa 
 Livio Lorenzon: Guzman 
 Germano Longo: Michel 
 Loris Gizzi: Governor 
 Philippe Hersent: Jean's Stepfather

Release
Guns of the Black Witch was released in Italy on 24 February 1961. It was released in the United States in December 1961.

Reception
The Monthly Film Bulletin declared the film to be a "very tepid affair" and that "even the Caribbean looks unenticing in this representation, and Paolella's direction makes heavy weather of the action."

See also
List of Italian films of 1961

References

Sources

External links

1961 films
1961 adventure films
Italian adventure films
French adventure films
Italian swashbuckler films
Films directed by Domenico Paolella
American International Pictures films
Films with screenplays by Ernesto Gastaldi
1960s Italian films
1960s French films